Typhlacontias johnsonii, Johnson's western burrowing skink, is a species of lizard which is found in Namibia and Angola.

References

johnsonii
Reptiles described in 1916
Taxa named by Lars Gabriel Andersson